John Ramsbottom may refer to:

John Ramsbottom (engineer) (1814–1897), English mechanical engineer who created many inventions for railways
John Ramsbottom (mycologist) (1885–1974), British mycologist
John Ramsbottom (MP), British Member of Parliament for Windsor 1810–1845 (known as John Ramsbottom, junior c.1810s)